Nezumia toi is a rattail of the family Macrouridae, found only in New Zealand at depths of about 950 m.  Its length is about 15 cm.

References
 
 Tony Ayling & Geoffrey Cox, Collins Guide to the Sea Fishes of New Zealand,  (William Collins Publishers Ltd, Auckland, New Zealand 1982) 

Macrouridae
Endemic marine fish of New Zealand
Fish described in 1980